Alwyn Isaac Warren (1 November 1931 – March 2004) was an Australian soccer player. Warren represented Australia at the 1956 Summer Olympics. Warren was a life member of the Ipswich Knights Soccer Club.

References

External links
 
 

1931 births
2004 deaths
Australian soccer players
Footballers at the 1956 Summer Olympics
Olympic soccer players of Australia
Association footballers not categorized by position